Maxime Montaggioni (born 22 August 1989) is a French para-snowboarder and parataekwondo practitioner. Born without a right hand, he competes in the SB-UL category. Montaggioni is six-time medallist at the World Para Snowboard Championships and a bronze medalist at the World Para Taekwondo Championships.

Career 
Montaggioni competed at the 2013 World Para Taekwondo Championships in Lausanne, winning a bronze medal in the -68 kg category. He then began his para-snowboarding career in 2015 at the international level. He distinguished himself with his first podium in the World Cup with the French team in March 2016 at the French resort "Les Angles". At the 2017 World Para Snowboard Championships held at the Big White Ski Resort, Montaggioni won his first medal, winning silver in snowboard cross event on 4 February. Three days later, he won the gold medal in the banked slalom event. He competed at the 2019 World Para Snowboard Championships, winning the gold medal in both the snowboard cross and banked slalom. 

Montaggioni won the gold medal in the men's dual banked slalom at the 2021 World Para Snow Sports Championships held in Lillehammer, Norway. He also won the gold medal in the men's snowboard cross event.

He competed in snowboarding at the 2022 Winter Paralympics held in Beijing, China and won the gold medal in the banked slalom SB-UL event.

References

External links 
 

1989 births
Living people
Sportspeople from Marseille
French male snowboarders
French male taekwondo practitioners
Snowboarders at the 2022 Winter Paralympics
Medalists at the 2022 Winter Paralympics
Paralympic medalists in snowboarding
Paralympic gold medalists for France
Paralympic snowboarders of France
21st-century French people